Bob Parkinson may refer to:
 Bob Parkinson (footballer)
 Bob Parkinson (aerospace engineer)

See also
 Robert Parkinson, Irish member of parliament